Elections to Liverpool Town Council were held on Monday 2 November 1874. One third of the council seats were up for election, the term of office of each councillor being three years.

All of the sixteen wards were uncontested.

After the election, the composition of the council was:

Election result

Ward results

* - Retiring Councillor seeking re-election

Abercromby

Castle Street

Everton

Exchange

Great George

Lime Street

North Toxteth

Pitt Street

Rodney Street

St. Anne Street

St. Paul's

St. Peter's

Scotland

South Toxteth

Vauxhall

West Derby

Aldermanic Election

At the meeting of the Council on 9 November 1874, the terms of office of eight 
alderman expired.

The following eight were elected as Aldermen by the Council 
(Aldermen and Councillors) on 9 November 1874 for a term of six years.

* - re-elected aldermen.

By-elections

Aldermanic By Election, 19 March 1875

The death of Alderman Thomas Cary (Conservative) was reported to the Council on 19 March 1875.

William Bennett was elected as an alderman by the Council on 19 March 1875.

No. 13, St. Anne Street, 9 July 1875

The death of Alderman James Tyrer (Conservative) was reported to the Council on 29 June 1875.

Dr. John Stepford Taylor (Conservative, St. Anne Street, elected unopposed 1 November 1873) was elected as an alderman by the Council (Councillors and Aldermen) on 29 June 1875.

No. 10, Rodney Street, 24 September 1875

Caused by the death of Councillor James Houghton (Conservative, Rodney Street, elected 1 November 1872).

No. 11, Abercromby, 14 October 1875

The Death of Councillor Robertson Gladstone (Liberal, Abercromby, elected 1 November 1873) was reported to the Council on 6 October 1875.

No. 14, West Derby, 21 October 1875

The Death of Councillor Francis Anderson Clint (Liberal, West Derby, elected 2 November 1874) was reported to the Council on 6 October 1875.

See also

 Liverpool City Council
 Liverpool Town Council elections 1835 - 1879
 Liverpool City Council elections 1880–present
 Mayors and Lord Mayors of Liverpool 1207 to present
 History of local government in England

References

1874
1874 English local elections
1870s in Liverpool